Carex remota, the remote sedge, is a species in the genus Carex, native to Europe, the Atlas Mountains in Africa, and western Asia. It is a riparian forest specialist. It is known as one of the most frequently hybridizing species of Carex, forming hybrids with C.appropinquata, C.arenaria, C.brizoides, C.canescens, C.divulsa, C.echinata, C.elongata, C.leporina, C.otrubae, C.paniculata, and C.spicata.

Subspecies
The following subspecies are currently accepted:

Carex remota subsp. remotaCarex remota subsp. stewartii'' Kukkonen

Notes

References

remota
Taxa named by Carl Linnaeus
Plants described in 1754